Marconi is surname and, more unfrequently, a given name. Notable people with the surname include:

Al Marconi (born 1969), Spanish Guitar international performer
Alfonso Marconi (1865–1936), Italian businessman and collector
Andrea Marconi (born 1985) Italian footballer
David Marconi, American screenwriter
Dominic Anthony Marconi (born 1927), American Roman Catholic bishop
Enrico Marconi, also known as Henryk Marconi (1792–1863), Italian architect
Francesco Marconi (1853 or 1855–1916), Italian operatic tenor 
Gaudenzio Marconi (1841–1885), Italian photographer
Gioia Marconi Braga (1916−1996), daughter of Guglielmo Marconi, founder and chairwoman of the Marconi Foundation
Gloria Marconi (born 1968), Italian long-distance runner 
Guglielmo Marconi (1874–1937), Italian electrical engineer and inventor of radio
Ivan Marconi (born 1989), Italian footballer 
Juan Martínez Marconi (born 1982), Chilean footballer
Joe Marconi (1934–1992), American football fullback
Jole Bovio Marconi (1897-1986), Italian archaeologist
Juan Martínez Marconi (born 1982), Chilean footballer
Lana Marconi (1917–1990), Romanian-French actress
Leandro Marconi (1834–1919), architect, son of Enrico Marconi
Leonard Marconi (1835–1899), Polish and Austro-Hungarian architect and sculptor
Lou Marconi (born 1973), American professional wrestler, trainer, and occasional actor
Luca Marconi (born 1989), Italian motorcycle racer
Maria Marconi (born 1984), Italian diver
Michele Marconi (born 1989), Italian footballer
Nazzareno Marconi (born 1958), Roman Catholic bishop of Macerata and Recanati
Nicola Marconi (born 1978), Italian diver
Rocco Marconi (before 1490–1529), Italian painter 
Saverio Marconi (born 1948), former Italian actor and stage director
Tommaso Marconi (born 1982), Italian diver
Władysław Marconi (1848-1915), Polish architect 

Notable people with the given name Marconi include
Marconi Ferreira Perillo Júnior (born 1963), Brazilian politician
Marconi Ribeiro Souza (born 1988), Brazilian footballer 
Marconi Turay (born 1949), Sierra Leonean athlete